Mirko Lamantia (born 1 March 1990) is an Italian football goalkeeper.

History
Lamantia started out playing at a young age for Novara. In 2007-2008, the young keeper moved to Genoa in co-ownership . after the club had just gained promotion to Serie A. In June 2009 Genoa got full ownership after Novara give up the rights. But Lamantia then left for Serie D side Borgosesia.

References

External links

Italian footballers
Association football goalkeepers
Novara F.C. players
Genoa C.F.C. players
People from Biella
1990 births
Living people
Footballers from Piedmont
Sportspeople from the Province of Biella